Tocha is a civil parish in the municipality of Cantanhede, Portugal. The population in 2011 was 3,992, in an area of 78.44 km².

References

Freguesias of Cantanhede, Portugal